Havel is a 2020 Czech historical film based on the life of dissident and former Czech president Václav Havel. It is directed by Slávek Horák and stars Viktor Dvořák. The film focuses on Havel's life from 1968 to 1989, when he was a dissident under the communist regime, as well as his relationship with his wife Olga and friend Pavel Landovský.

Synopsis
The film starts in 1968. Václav Havel works as a playwright at Theatre on the Balustrade, where he receives ovations. His career is interrupted by the Warsaw Pact invasion of Czechoslovakia. The story then moves to 1976, when he participates in the preparation of Charter 77, which leads to his imprisonment. The story largely focuses on Havel's personal life and relationship with his wife Olga. The film ends in 1989, during the Velvet Revolution.

Cast and characters
 Viktor Dvořák as Václav Havel
 Aňa Geislerová as Olga Havlová
 Martin Hofmann as Pavel Landovský
 Stanislav Majer as Pavel Kohout
 Barbora Seidlová as Anna Kohoutová
 Jiří Bartoška as Jan Patočka
 Adrian Jastraban as Alexander Dubček
 Michal Isteník as interrogator
 Jiří Wohanka as interrogator
 Miroslav Hanuš as Václav Havel’s lawyer
 Vanda Janda as secretary

See also
 Dubček
 Walesa: Man of Hope

References

External links
 
 Havel at CSFD.cz 

2020 films
Czech historical drama films
2020s Czech-language films
2020s historical drama films
Václav Havel
Czech films based on actual events